Sang Bast or Sang-e Bast may refer to:
 Sang-e Bast, Mazandaran
 Sang Bast, Razavi Khorasan
 Sang Bast Rural District, in Razavi Khorasan Province